Elvir is a predominantly Bosnian male given name. It may refer to:

Elvir Bolić (born 1971), retired Bosnian footballer 
Elvir Laković Laka (born 1969), Bosnian rock musician 
Elvir Mekić (born 1981), Macedonian musician of Bosniak origin
Elvir Melunović (born 1979), Swiss footballer
Elvir Muriqi, Kosovar-Albanian boxer
Elvir Rahimić (born 1976), retired Bosnian footballer 

Bosnian masculine given names